Evaldas Žabas (born 21 April 1988 in Vilnius, Lithuanian SSR) is a Lithuanian professional basketball player. He plays the point guard position.

Club career 
Žabas moved to Canada from his native Lithuania when he was 15 years old and played at St. Michael's College School. He averaged about 40 points per game his senior year. After graduating in 2007, he played in Europe for several years, most notably for the British Basketball League's Plymouth Raiders and Sweden Basketligan's Jamtland Basket, leading the latter league and team in points per game (21.9).

In 2013, he returned to Canada and played for Brampton A's during its debut season. In 2014, he signed with Lithuania's BC Lietkabelis. He led the team with 14.3 points and 3.5 assists per game and achieved recognition for his excellent performance against Lietuvos Rytas and Žalgiris at the end of the season.

On July 25, 2016, Žabas joined Rethymno Cretan Kings of the Greek Basket League. However, he left the team to join  Pieno Žvaigždes

In June 2019, signed with Úrvalsdeild karla club Njarðvík. He was released by Njarðvík on 21 October 2019 after appearing in three games where he averaged 12.0 points and 3.3 assists.

International career 
Žabas represented Lithuania at the 2008 FIBA Europe Under-20 Championship, which won a silver medal. He averaged 2.8 points, 1.0 rebounds and 0.3 assists per game.

External links 
 EuroBasket.com Profile
 Profile at RealGM.com

References 

1988 births
Living people
BC Lietkabelis players
Brampton A's players
Eisbären Bremerhaven players
Jämtland Basket players
Lithuanian expatriate basketball people in Estonia
Lithuanian expatriate basketball people in Iceland
Lithuanian men's basketball players
Plymouth Raiders players
Point guards
Njarðvík men's basketball players
Rethymno B.C. players
Basketball players from Vilnius
University of Tartu basketball team players
Úrvalsdeild karla (basketball) players
Valur men's basketball players
Worcester Wolves players